The 2004 Maui Invitational Tournament was an early-season college basketball tournament that was played, for the 21st time, from November 22 to November 24, 2004.  The tournament began in 1984, and was part of the 2004–05 NCAA Division I men's basketball season.  The tournament was played at the Lahaina Civic Center in Maui, Hawaii and was won by the North Carolina Tar Heels. It was UNC's second Maui title and the second for head coach Roy Williams, who led the Kansas Jayhawks to the 1996 title.

Bracket

References

Maui Invitational Tournament
Maui Invitational
Maui